7:84 was a Scottish left-wing agitprop theatre group. The name comes from a statistic on distribution of wealth in the United Kingdom, published in The Economist in 1966, that 7% of the population of the UK owned 84% of the country's wealth.

The group was founded by playwright John McGrath, his wife Elizabeth MacLennan and her brother David MacLennan in 1971, and operated throughout Great Britain. In 1973, it split into 7:84 (England) and 7:84 (Scotland). The English group folded in 1984, having lost its grant from the Arts Council of Great Britain. Jo Beddoe joined the Scottish group as producer in 1988 until 1992; however, it lost its funding from the Scottish Arts Council in 2006, though Artistic Director Lorenzo Mele successfully secured funding for a further year from April 2007. He subsequently commissioned a series of four plays, Wound by Nicola McCartney, Eclipse by Haresh Sharma, A Time To Go by Selma Dimitrijevic, and Doch-An-Doris (A Parting Drink) by Linda McLean. Together, these short plays formed Re:Union, a production which toured Scotland in early 2007. This was followed in September 2007 by Raman Mundair's The Algebra of Freedom, which also toured extensively throughout Scotland. This production was directed by 7:84's Associate Director, Jo Ronan, and designed by David Sneddon.

On 31 December 2008, the Scottish company ceased operating, citing "the changing funding structures in Scottish theatre."

Touring productions

Although much of its work centres on outreach projects throughout Scotland, 7:84 was principally known for its touring productions. The following table contains details of all 7:84's major productions that toured nationally.

Notable people
Peter Mcbrearty (guitarist) 
Jo Beddoe 
 Henry Ian Cusick
Dick Gaughan
Bill Paterson
David Hayman
Douglas Henshall 
Valerie Lilley
Dolina MacLennan
Steve McNicholas
Cathy-Ann McPhee 
Hilton McRae
Alexander Morton
Peter Mullan 
Alex Norton
David Paisley
Laurance Rudic
David Tennant
The Flying Pickets
Allan Stuart Ross (fiddle)

Reviews
Findlay, Bill (1982), review of Clydebuilt: A season of Scottish Popular Drama from the '20s, '30s and '40s, in Hearn, Sheila G. (ed.), Cencrastus No. 10, Autumn 1982, p. 39,

References 

Theatre companies in Scotland
1971 establishments in Scotland
Political theatre companies
1971 in theatre
Arts organizations established in 1971
Socialism in Scotland